Geoffrey V (Geoffroy V) (died 1218), Viscount of Châteaudun, son of Hugh VI, Viscount of Châteaudun, and Jeanne de Preuilly, daughter of Gosbert de Preuilly, Seigneur of Bouchet and Guerche, and Adela de Vendôme.

Geoffrey’s first marriage was to Adelicia de Nevers.  Adelicia is listed in Europäische Stammtafeln as Geoffrey’s wife but no heritage is identified.  The most likely candidate for her parents are William IV, Count of Nevers, and Eléonore, Countess of Vermandois, although this has not been verified.  Geoffrey and Adelicia had nine children:
 Philippe (died 1202)
 Hugues (died 1202)
 Geoffrey VI, Viscount of Châteaudun
 Isabelle (died 1259 or after)
 Alix (died after October 1239), married Herve III Seigneur de Gallardon
 Jeanne (died 1217 or after)
 Agnes (died after 1271), married Jean Seigneur d’Estouteville, son of Henri, Seigneur d’Estouteville, and Mathilde d’Eu, a descendant of Geoffrey, Count of Eu, son of Richard I, Duke of Normandy
 Etienne
 Renaud.

Geoffrey married secondly Alix de Fréteval, daughter of Urso II, Seigneur de Fréteval, and Grecie de Faye.  Urso’s father was a rival of Geoffrey’s ancestor and namesake Geoffrey III of Châteaudun. No children are recorded from this marriage.

Upon his death, Geoffrey was succeeded by his son Geoffrey VI.

Sources 
 Settipani, Christian, Les vicomtes de Châteaudun et leurs alliés, dans Onomastique et Parenté dans l'Occident médiéval, Oxford, Linacre, Unit for Prosopographical Research, 2000
 Europäische Stammtafeln, Vol. III, Les Vicomtes de Châteaudun
 Medieval Lands Project, Vicomtes de Châteaudun

12th-century births
1218 deaths

Year of birth unknown
Viscounts of Châteaudun